Judicial interference is the actions of courts or judicial officers in matters that are interpreted by some as beyond their constitutionally established role. 

Jurisprudence
Philosophy of law
Practice of law